Downtown Toronto is the main central business district of Toronto, Ontario, Canada. Located entirely within the district of Old Toronto, it is approximately 16.6 square kilometres in area, bounded by Bloor Street to the northeast and Dupont Street to the northwest, Lake Ontario to the south, the Don Valley to the east, and Bathurst Street to the west. It is also the home of the municipal government of Toronto and the Government of Ontario.

The area is made up of Canada's largest concentration of skyscrapers and businesses that form Toronto's skyline. Downtown Toronto has the third most skyscrapers in North America exceeding  in height, behind Midtown Manhattan, New York City and the Chicago Loop.

Neighbourhoods

The retail core of the downtown is located along Yonge Street from Queen Street to College Street. There is a large cluster of retail centres and shops in the area, including the Toronto Eaton Centre indoor mall. There are an estimated 600 retail stores, 150 bars and restaurants, and 7 hotels. In recent years the area has been experiencing a renaissance as the Business Improvement Area (BIA) has brought in new retail and improved the cleanliness. The area has also seen the opening of the Dundas Square public square, a public space for holding performances and art displays. The area includes several live theatres, a movie complex at Dundas Square and the historic Massey Hall. Historical sites and landmarks include the Arts & Letter Club, the Church of the Holy Trinity, Mackenzie House, Maple Leaf Gardens, Old City Hall, and the Toronto Police Museum and Discovery Centre.

The Financial District, centred on the intersection of Bay Street and King Street is the centre of Canada's financial industry. It contains the Toronto Stock Exchange, which is the largest in Canada and tenth in the world by market capitalization as of 2021. The construction of skyscrapers in downtown Toronto had started to rapidly increase since the 1960s.
 
The area of St. Lawrence to the east of the financial district is one of the oldest areas of Toronto. It features heritage buildings, theatres, music, dining and many pubs. It is a community of distinct downtown neighbourhoods including the site of the original Town of York, which was Toronto's first neighbourhood, dating back to 1793. The area boasts one of the largest concentrations of 19th-century buildings in Ontario. Of particular note is St. Lawrence Hall, St. James' Cathedral, St. Michael's Cathedral, St. Paul's Basilica, the Enoch Turner School House, the Bank of Upper Canada, Le Royal Meridien King Edward Hotel, and the Gooderham Building. On Saturday there is a farmers' market. Other historical districts in downtown Toronto include Cabbagetown, Corktown, the Distillery District, and Old Town.

To the west of the financial district is the Entertainment District. It is home to hundreds of restaurants, nightclubs, sporting facilities, boutiques, hotels, attractions, and live theatre. The district was formerly an industrial area and was redeveloped for entertainment purposes in the early 1980s, becoming a major centre for entertainment. The redevelopment started with the Mirvish family refurbishing the Royal Alexandra Theatre and their construction of the Princess of Wales Theatre. The area is now the site of Roy Thomson Hall and the Canadian Broadcasting Centre.

The Yorkville area, to the north, north of Bloor Street and the Mink Mile, has more than 700 designer boutiques, spas, restaurants, hotels, and world-class galleries. It is a former village in its own right (prior to 1883) and since the early 1970s has developed into an up-scale shopping district. The intersection of Bloor and Yonge Streets is the intersection of the city's subway lines and is one of the busiest intersections in the city. At the intersection of Avenue Road and Bloor Street is the Royal Ontario Museum, the largest museum in the city, with a diverse anthropological and natural history collection.

The Harbourfront area to the south was formerly an industrial and railway lands area. Since the 1970s, it has seen extensive redevelopment, including the building of the Rogers Centre stadium, numerous condominiums and the Harbourfront Centre waterfront revitalization. The area to the east of Yonge Street is still in transition, with the conversion of industrial lands to mixed residential and commercial uses planned.

Among the important government headquarters in downtown Toronto include the Ontario Legislature, and the Toronto City Hall.

List of neighbourhoods

Architecture

In the 1970s, Toronto experienced major economic growth and surpassed Montreal to become the largest city in Canada. Many international and domestic businesses relocated to Toronto and created massive new skyscrapers downtown. All of Canada's Big Five banks constructed skyscrapers beginning in the late 1960s up until the early 1990s.

Today downtown Toronto contains dozens of notable skyscrapers. The area's First Canadian Place is the tallest building in Canada at a height of 298 metres (978 feet). The CN Tower, once the tallest free-standing structure in the world, remains the tallest such structure in the Americas, standing at 553.33 metres (1,815 ft., 5 inches). Other notable buildings include Scotia Plaza, TD Centre, Commerce Court, the Royal Bank Plaza, The Bay's flagship store, and the Fairmont Royal York Hotel.

Since 2007, urban consolidation has been centred in downtown Toronto and as a result has been undergoing Manhattanization with the construction of new office towers, hotels and condos.

Demographics
As of 2016, the population of Downtown Toronto was 237,698 people with 503,575 jobs located within the area. The population density was 143 people per hectare, and the job density was 303 jobs per hectare.

Landmarks

Education

Downtown Toronto is home to three public universities, OCAD University, Toronto Metropolitan University, and the University of Toronto. OCAD University is Canada's largest and oldest post secondary institution for art and design. Toronto Metropolitan University is a research university, whose campus is located near downtown Yonge Street. The University of Toronto is a collegiate research university, whose St. George campus is situated downtown. Established in 1827, the University of Toronto is the oldest university in the province of Ontario. In addition, downtown Toronto also hosts one college, George Brown College.

Four different public school boards provide primary and secondary education for the City of Toronto, as well as the downtown area. Two Toronto-based school boards provide instruction in the English language, the secular Toronto District School Board, and the separate Toronto Catholic District School Board. The other two Toronto-based school boards, the secular Conseil scolaire Viamonde, and the separate Conseil scolaire catholique MonAvenir provide instruction in the French language.

The Royal Conservatory of Music is a non-profit music education institution that is headquartered in downtown Toronto.

Retail

Downtown Toronto is home to the flagship department stores of The Bay, Saks Fifth Avenue and Nordstrom (formerly Sears Canada). The CF Toronto Eaton Centre, a large, multilevel enclosed shopping mall and office complex that spans several blocks and houses 330 stores, is the city's top tourist attraction with over one million visitors weekly.

Transportation

Yonge Street, a major arterial route in the city, begins at the northern shore of the Toronto Harbour and runs through downtown, continuing north all the way to the city of Barrie, Ontario. Other notable streets include Dundas, Bloor, Queen, King, and University.

The Toronto Transit Commission administers the Toronto area's public transportation system, including buses, streetcar, and subways. The regional public transportation service, GO Transit, also provides bus and commuter train service to downtown Toronto from its hub, Union Station. Union Station is the city's major intermodal transportation hub, providing access not only to local and regional public transit, but also to inter-city rail services like Via Rail.

In addition to surface-level pedestrian sidewalks, much of downtown Toronto is also connected through the PATH Underground, an extensive network of underground pedestrian tunnels, skyways, and at-grade walkways.

Nearby airports include Billy Bishop Toronto City Airport, which is adjacent to the downtown area, and the much larger Toronto Pearson International Airport located 27 km to the northwest.

See also

 List of central business districts

Notes

References

Neighbourhoods in Toronto
Toronto
Economy of Toronto